Eucalyptus concinna, commonly known as the Victoria Desert mallee, is a mallee or small tree that is endemic to Australia. It usually has rough, grey-brown on the lower part of its trunk, smooth bark above, lance-shaped adult leaves, flower buds in groups of between seven and eleven, white flowers and cup-shaped fruit. It has a widespread distribution in South Australia and Western Australia, centred on the Great Victoria Desert.

Description
It has rough grey-brown, thick to flaky for the lower half of the trunk with pale grey or coppery smooth bark above. The buds are often orange or red immediately before flowering. Flowering occurs sporadically, probably depending on rainfall and the flowers are white.

Taxonomy
Eucalyptus concinna was first formally described by the botanists Joseph Maiden and William Blakely in 1929 from a specimen collected by Richard Helms in 1891 during the Elder Exploring Expedition. The specific epithet (concinna) is a Latin word meaning "well-arranged",  "skilfully joined", "beautiful" or "striking", "probably referring to the habit and overall appearance of the plant".

Distribution
Victoria Desert mallee grows in red sand or red clayey sand or sandy loam in sandplains or sandhill areas. It is distributed throughout the Goldfields-Esperance and Mid West regions of Western Australia and the west of South Australia as far east as the Gawler Ranges.

Conservation status
This eucalypt is classified as "not threatened" in Western Australia by the Western Australian Government Department of Parks and Wildlife.

See also
List of Eucalyptus species

References

concinna
Flora of South Australia
Mallees (habit)
Myrtales of Australia
Eucalypts of Western Australia
Plants described in 1929
Taxa named by Joseph Maiden
Taxa named by William Blakely